Copelatus feae is a species of diving beetle. It is part of the genus Copelatus in the subfamily Copelatinae of the family Dytiscidae. It was described by Régimbart in 1888.

References

feae
Beetles described in 1888